Colcha K is a village serving as the capital of Nor Lípez Province, in the Potosí Department of Bolivia. It is also the capital of the Colcha "K" Canton and Colcha "K" Municipality.

References 

Populated places in Potosí Department